Susan Tsui Grundmann is an American attorney who has been confirmed by the U.S. Senate to serve as a member of the Federal Labor Relations Authority.

Early life

Grundmann received a bachelor's degree at American University. She received her JD from Georgetown University Law Center.

Career

She was a law clerk for the 19th Judicial Circuit in Virginia.

She worked at the Sheet Metal Workers’ National Pension Fund. Grundmann served as General Counsel to the National Air Traffic Controllers Association. She taught law at the William W. Winpisinger Education and Technology Center from 2003-2009. Grundmann was general counsel for the National Federation of Federal Employees.

From 2009 until 2017, Grundmann served as the chairwoman of the Merit Systems Protection Board. 
She had been confirmed by voice vote.

Until nominated to the Federal Labor Relations Authority, Grundmann served as the executive director and Chief Operating Officer of the US Congress Office of Congressional Workplace Rights, formerly known as the Office of Compliance. In that role, she had testified before the US Congress. A major issue under her office's purview is dealing with sexual harassment in the Legislative Branch.

On March 30, 2022, the US Senate agreed to bring debate to a close on her nomination to the Federal Labor Relations Authority. On May 12, 2022, the U.S. Senate voted 50-49 to confirm Grundmann's nomination. Her term expires July 1, 2025.

References

External links 
 
 Tom Fox, "Grundmann on protecting merit systems in the federal government," Washington Post, September 8, 2011.

Living people
21st-century American lawyers
American University alumni
Georgetown University Law Center alumni
Year of birth missing (living people)